The Pescadores campaign (23–26 March 1895) was the last military operation of the First Sino-Japanese War and an essential preliminary to the Japanese conquest of Taiwan.

Background 
As the First Sino-Japanese War approached its end, the Japanese took steps to ensure that Qing-ruled Formosa (Taiwan) and the Pescadores (Penghu) would be ceded to Japan under the eventual peace treaty. Although hostilities in northern China were halted during the peace negotiations that eventually resulted in the Treaty of Shimonoseki (April 1895), Taiwan and the Pescadores were specifically excluded from the scope of the armistice, allowing the Japanese to mount a military operation against them without imperiling the peace negotiations. The key to the capture of Taiwan was the Pescadores, which lay midway between mainland China and Taiwan. Their occupation by the Japanese would prevent further Chinese reinforcements from being sent across the Taiwan Strait.

On 15 March 1895, a Japanese expeditionary force of 5,500 men set sail for the Pescadores Islands. The expeditionary force landed on Pa-chau Island (modern-day Wangan), to the south of the main Pescadores archipelago, on the morning of 23 March.

Campaign 
Although the Pescadores were garrisoned by 15 Chinese regular battalions (5,000 men) and defended by the recently completed Hsi-tai coastal defense battery (built in the late 1880s in response to the capture of Pescadores by the French during the Sino-French War), the Japanese met very little resistance during the landing operation as the defenders were demoralized. It took the Japanese only three days to secure the islands. After a naval bombardment of the Chinese forts, Japanese troops went ashore on Fisher Island (modern-day Siyu) and Penghu Island on 24 March, fought several brief actions with defending Chinese troops, and captured the Hsi-tai battery (known to the Japanese, from the Japanese pronunciation of its Chinese characters, as the Kon-peh-tai fort; likely ) and Makung. In the next two days they occupied the other main islands of the Pescadores group.

The following detailed account of the 1895 Pescadores campaign, drawing on official Japanese sources, was included by James W. Davidson in his book The Island of Formosa, Past and Present, published in 1903.  Davidson was a war correspondent with the Japanese army during the invasion of Taiwan, and enjoyed privileged access to senior Japanese officers.

Casualties 
Japanese battle casualties were minimal. However, an outbreak of cholera shortly after the capture of the islands claimed the lives of more than 1,500 Japanese soldiers within a few days.

See also
 Taiwanese Resistance to the Japanese Invasion (1895)

References

Works cited

 

Conflicts in 1895
1895 in Taiwan
Battles of the First Sino-Japanese War
Battles involving Taiwan
Taiwan under Qing rule
Taiwan under Japanese rule
1895 in China
1895 in Japan
March 1895 events